United Nations Security Council Resolution 395, adopted unanimously on August 25, 1976, after hearing various points by the foreign ministers of Greece and Turkey regarding a territorial dispute in the Aegean Sea, the Council noted the ongoing tension and called on both sides to exercise restraint and enter negotiations. It also made both countries aware that the International Court of Justice is qualified enough to be able to settle any remaining legal disputes.

Greece had accused Turkey of conducting seismological operations on the continental shelf claimed by Greece. Meanwhile, Turkey had protested against harassment and intimidation of a Turkish civilian research vessel.

See also
 Aegean dispute
 Greek–Turkish relations
 List of United Nations Security Council Resolutions 301 to 400 (1971–1976)

References

External links
 
Text of the Resolution at undocs.org

 0395
1976 in Greece
1976 in Turkey
Greece–Turkey relations
 0395
 0395
1970s in Greek politics
August 1976 events